Zoomorph is an example of Zoomorphism, the shaping of something in animal form or terms

Zoomorph may also refer to:
 Zoomorphs, a line of educational toys by River Dolphin Toys

See also
 Zoomorphic palette, an ancient Egyptian animal-shaped palette
 Animal style